Luca Salvatore Ricci (born February 23, 1998) is a Canadian professional soccer player who plays as a midfielder.

Club career
Ricci began his career with the Montreal Impact Academy.
Ricci was loaned to Phoenix Rising FC for the 2018 season on February 2, 2018. He signed with Ottawa Fury FC on February 1, 2019. He joined the Fury's MLS-affiliate Montreal Impact on an emergency loan under the Emergency Hardship Rule.

In 2021, he began playing university soccer for the Montreal Carabins, while also playing in the semi-pro PLSQ with FC Lanaudière.

At the 2022 CPL-U Sports Draft, he was selected 8th overall by Pacific FC. On May 12, 2022, he signed a U Sports contract with Pacific. He departed the club at the end of the season.

International career
In 2017, he was called up to a Quebec-Canada U20 team to play friendlies against Haiti U20, who were preparing for the 2017 Jeux de la Francophonie.

Personal life
Ricci was born in LaSalle, Quebec, Canada to Italian parents. His mother was born in Calabria, Italy. He speaks English, French and Italian.

References

External links

US Development Academy Stats
Montreal Impact bio

1998 births
Living people
Association football midfielders
Canadian soccer players
People from LaSalle, Quebec
Soccer players from Montreal
Canadian people of Italian descent
Canadian people of Calabrian descent
Canadian expatriate soccer players
Expatriate soccer players in the United States
Canadian expatriate sportspeople in the United States
CF Montréal players
Phoenix Rising FC players
Ottawa Fury FC players
FC Lanaudière players
Pacific FC draft picks
Pacific FC players
USL Championship players
Première ligue de soccer du Québec players